Earls Court Rangers were an early English ice hockey team that played in the English National League. They were formed in 1935 and disbanded in 1953. They played their home games at the Earls Court Arena in west London, England at Empress Hall; played only 9 seasons interrupted in 1939 by World War II.

Empress Hall

In September 1953, the British Ice Hockey association announced that in the upcoming season the Earls Court Rangers would not play.  The club's directors chose not to play that season because its headquarters, Empress Hall in London, was undergoing structural alterations.  The alterations were expected to take three months, but in fact the Empress
Hall was never rebuilt and now Earls Court 2 and Lillie Road Bus and Tube Depot stand in its spot.

The team was formed in 1935 and played in the league every year until 1940, then from 1948 to 1953.  From 1940 to 1947, Empress Hall was under government requisition.

1937 Fixtures

Earl Nicholson, of Harringay Greyhounds, and Howie Peterson, of Earl’s Court Rangers, were suspended on 31 December 1937 until 23 January 1938 for 26 days which was at the time the longest suspension awarded in British ice hockey when both Canadian players "tried to take each other apart" when Earls Court Rangers lost 4-2 against Harringay Greyhounds on 29 December 1937.  On 6 November 1937 Princess Maria Gabriella of Savoy when visiting London saw Earls Court Rangers play against Harringay Racers.

Coaches

Frank Currie - player coach

Notable players

See also
Empress State Building
Wembley Canadians

References

A to Z Encyclopaedia of Ice Hockey entry

External links
Empress Theatre / Empress Hall, Lillie Road, Earls Court, London

 
Defunct ice hockey teams in the United Kingdom
Ice hockey teams in London
Ice hockey clubs established in 1935
Ice hockey clubs disestablished in 1953